The Squid Jiggin' Ground written by Arthur Scammell (1928) is a song that describes a traditional way of life of local Newfoundland fisherman. The song is unique in that it describes the method of jigging for squid and the type of equipment and circumstance that revolve around the activity.

The song is sung to the traditional Irish jig Larry O'Gaff.

On 1 April 1949, in ceremonies marking Newfoundland's confederation with Canada, the tune was played as the representative song for Newfoundland on the carillon of the Peace Tower in Ottawa.

It was recorded by Hank Snow on a single for the Canadian market and by Finest Kind for their album Heart's Delight. Stompin' Tom Connors also sang the song back in 1973 at the Horseshoe Tavern in Toronto Canada, a performance available on his live DVD "Across This Land With Stompin Tom Connors".

Notes

See also
 List of Newfoundland songs

Recordings
 Finest Kind Heart's Delight 1999
 The Wiggles and Tom McGlynn Let's Eat! 2010
 The Wiggles and Tim Chaisson Duets 2017
 Ryan's Fancy 
Mark Alan Lovewell Sea Songs Of Martha’s Vineyard 2002 remastered 2004

External links
Newfoundland Heritage, Traditional Songs
Dictionary of Newfoundland English
Squid Jiggin’ Ground 
Larry O'Gaff, The Session

Canadian folk songs
Newfoundland and Labrador folk songs